New Amazonia: A Foretaste of the Future is a feminist utopian novel, written by Elizabeth Burgoyne Corbett and first published in 1889. It was one element in the wave of utopian and dystopian literature that marked the later nineteenth and early twentieth centuries.

Context
Corbett wrote the novel in response to Mrs Humphry Ward's "An Appeal Against Female Suffrage", an open letter published in The Nineteenth Century and signed by over a hundred other women against the extension of Parliamentary suffrage to women.

Plot
In her novel, Corbett envisions a successful suffragette movement eventually giving rise to a breed of highly evolved "Amazonians" who turn Ireland into a utopian society. The book's female narrator wakes up in the year 2472, much like Julian West awakens in the year 2000 in Edward Bellamy's Looking Backward (1888). Corbett's heroine, however, is accompanied by a man of her own time, who has similarly awakened from a hashish dream to find himself in New Amazonia.

The Victorian woman and man are given an account of intervening history by one of the Amazonians. In the early twentieth century, war between Britain and Ireland decimated the Irish population; the British repopulated the island with their own surplus women. (After the war, which also involved France on the side of Ireland, British women outnumbered men by three to one.) Women came to dominate all aspects of society on the island.

The history lesson is followed by a tour of the new society, which embodies a version of state socialism. Men are allowed to live on the island, but cannot hold political office: "masculine government has always held openings for the free admission of corruption, injustice, immorality, and narrow-minded, self-glorifying bigotry." The Amazonians are vegetarians; they employ euthanasia, eliminating malformed children — and bastards. They maintain their superiority by practicing "nerve-rejuvenation," in which the life energy of dogs is transferred to humans. The result is that the Amazonians grow to be seven feet tall, and live for hundreds of years but look no older than forty. The narrator tries the procedure herself: "The sensation I experienced was little more than a pin-prick in intensity, but...I felt ten years younger and stronger, and was proportionately elated at my good fortune." (The procedure, though, is fatal to the dogs.)

The narrator reacts very positively to what she sees and learns; but her male companion reacts precisely oppositely and adjusts badly — to the point where the Amazonians judge him to be insane. The narrator nonetheless tries to protect her male counterpart, and in the process is accidentally transported back to the grimmer realities of Victorian England.

Matriarchy resistance
W. H. Hudson's second novel, A Crystal Age (1887), published two years earlier than Corbett's book, also contains the plot element of a nineteenth-century man who cannot adapt to a matriarchal society of the future.

The author
Little is known about Newcastle journalist Elizabeth Corbett, who published as "Mrs. George Corbett." Some of her fifteen novels — mysteries, adventure stories, and mainstream fiction — have clear feminist themes and elements, despite the traditional values of the age in which she lived and worked.

See also

 Arqtiq
 The Diothas
 Mizora
 The Republic of the Future
 Sultana's Dream
 2894
 Herland (novel)

References

1889 British novels
1889 science fiction novels
Utopian novels
Feminist science fiction novels
Novels set in Ireland
Novels set in the 25th century